Discussions avec mes parents ("Conversations with My Parents") is a Canadian television comedy series, which premiered in 2018 on Ici Radio-Canada Télé. A fictionalized version of the life of comedian François Morency based on his book, the series is set in Quebec City and stars Morency as himself, alongside Vincent Bilodeau and Marie-Ginette Guay as his parents Jean-Pierre and Rollande, Blaise Tardif as his brother Reynald, and Caroline Bouchard as his sister Judith.

The series premiered on September 10, 2018, and is filmed in Montreal, Quebec. A second season aired in 2019, a third season aired in 2020, with a fourth season slated to air in 2021.

In June 2021, it was announced that NBCUniversal has purchased rights to produce an American remake of the series.

References

External links

2018 Canadian television series debuts
2010s Canadian sitcoms
2020s Canadian sitcoms
Ici Radio-Canada Télé original programming
Television shows filmed in Montreal
Television shows set in Quebec City